Anton Müller (born 12 February 1947) is a Swiss sports shooter. He competed at the 1976 Summer Olympics and the 1984 Summer Olympics.

References

1947 births
Living people
Swiss male sport shooters
Olympic shooters of Switzerland
Shooters at the 1976 Summer Olympics
Shooters at the 1984 Summer Olympics
Place of birth missing (living people)